Catshill is a village in Worcestershire about 2.5 miles north of Bromsgrove and 10 miles south-west of Birmingham. The parish of Catshill was formed around the Turnpike Road (A38) in 1844.

The population of Catshill in 2011 was 6,858.

Education
Catshill is home to Catshill First School  and Catshill Middle School.  The first school Catshill First School and Nursery is located in the centre of the village on Gibb Lane.  The Middle School was built in 1939, and was converted from a Secondary Modern to a Middle School in 1970. The village has a small library, though it is not open every day. Catshill also has a village hall in which many different learning activities take place, from karate to IT skills.

Transport
Catshill is served by regular bus services by First Midland Red, Diamond West Midlands,  National Express West Midlands and MRD Travel. There are routes to Longbridge, Halesowen, Stourbridge, Bromsgrove, Worcester and Droitwich.

With  nearby  access to the M5 and M42 motorways, Catshill is within  commuting distance by car to both Worcester and Birmingham and as a result the population of the village has grown in recent years.

History
In 1828 a Baptist chapel was opened in Little Catshill.

Catshill developed in the nineteenth century through nailmaking and by 1914 was one of the few villages in the area which produced nails.

Famous people
The poet Alfred Edward Housman lived in Catshill.
The professional footballer Roy Hartle (Bolton Wanderers) was born here.
For more than a quarter of a century Sarah Hilda Haines was the much respected district nurse (plaque in church)  who received the royal Maundy in 1980 at Worcester. Her son Roy Martin Haines, a Foundation Scholar of Bromsgrove School, became a mediaeval historian (Worcester College, Oxford) and professor at Dalhousie University, Canada. A Fellow of the Society of Antiquaries and life member of Clare Hall, Cambridge, he was awarded the degrees of D.Phil.and D.Litt. of Oxford.

References

Villages in Worcestershire